The neotropic cormorant or olivaceous cormorant (Nannopterum brasilianum) is a medium-sized cormorant found throughout the American tropics and subtropics, from the middle Rio Grande and the Gulf and Californian coasts of the United States south through Mexico and Central America to southern South America, where it is called by the indigenous name of biguá. It also breeds on the Bahamas, Cuba and Trinidad. It can be found both at coasts (including some mangrove areas) and on inland waters. There are at least two subspecies: N. b. mexicanum from Nicaragua northwards and N. b. brasilianum further south. In Peru the neotropic cormorant is used by the Uru people for fishing.

Taxonomy
The neotropic cormorant was documented in 1658 by the Dutch naturalist Willem Piso after travels in Brazil. This formed the basis for the formal description and naming of the species by Johann Friedrich Gmelin in 1789. He placed it with the petrels in the genus Procellaria and coined the binomial name Procellaria brasiliana. Many authors preferred to use Alexander von Humboldt's 1805 description of Pelecanus olivaceus because the identity of Piso's birds was considered uncertain. Later, ornithological authorities such as the American Ornithologists' Union began to use Phalacrocorax brasilianus after Ralph Browning argued that Piso's description and paintings do indeed refer to the neotropic cormorant.

The neotropic cormorant was formerly placed in the genus Phalacrocorax. A molecular phylogenetic study of the cormorants published in 2014 found that the neotropic cormorant, the double-crested cormorant and the flightless cormorant formed a clade that was sister to the genus Leucocarbo. The three species were therefore moved the resurrected genus Nannopterum that had been introduced in 1899 by English ornithologist Richard Bowdler Sharpe to accommodate the flightless cormorant. The genus name Nannopterum combines the Ancient Greek nannos meaning "dwarf" with pteron meaning "wing".

Two subspecies are recognised:
 N. b. mexicanum (Brandt, JF, 1837) – inland and coastal Great Plains (central USA) from South Dakota and Kansas to Gulf of Mexico, and Mexico to Nicaragua; Bahamas and Cuba
 N. b. brasilianum (Gmelin, JF, 1789) – inland and coastal Costa Rica to Tierra del Fuego

Description
Birds of the southern populations tend to be bigger than the more northerly birds. It is small and slender, especially compared to the larger, heavier-looking double-crested cormorant. It has a long tail and frequently holds its neck in an S-shape. Adult plumage is mainly black, with a yellow-brown throat patch. During breeding, white tufts appear on the sides of the head, there are scattered white filoplumes on the side of the head and the neck, and the throat patch develops a white edge. The upper wings are somewhat grayer than the rest of the body. Juveniles are brownish in color.

Behaviour
Unlike other cormorants, this bird can often be seen perching on wires.

Food and feeding
Its diet consists mainly of small fish, but will also eat tadpoles, frogs, aquatic insects (such as dragonfly nymphs), and shrimp. This cormorant forages for food by diving underwater, propelling itself by its feet. Its dives are brief, between 5 and 15 seconds. It is also known to forage in groups, with several birds beating the water with their wings to drive fish forward into shallows.

Breeding
Neotropic cormorants are monogamous and breed in colonies. The nest is a platform of sticks with a depression in the center circled with twigs and grass. It is built a few meters above the ground or water in bushes or trees. Up to five chalky, bluish-white eggs are laid. Most pairs lay three eggs, but the mean number hatched is less than two. The eggs soon become nest-stained. Both sexes incubate for about 25–30 days, and both parents feed the young until around the 11th week. By week 12, they are independent. One brood is raised per year.

This bird is largely a permanent resident, with some birds occasionally wandering north in the warmer months.

References 

 Johnsgaard, P. A. (1993), Cormorants, darters and pelicans of the world. Washington DC: Smithsonian Institution Press.
 Kaufman, Kenn; Lives of North American Birds. Houghton Mifflin Company, New York, NY (1996). 
 World Wildlife Fund. 2010. Petenes mangroves. eds. Mark McGinley, C.Michael Hogan & C. Cleveland. Encyclopedia of Earth. National Council for Science and the Environment. Washington DC
 Alsop, Fred J. III; Birds of Texas. Smithsonian Handbooks: DK Publishing, Inc. (2002).

External links
 
 
 Neotropic Cormorant, Cornell University of Ornithology
 

Neotropic comorant
Birds of the Americas
Birds of the Rio Grande valleys
Birds of Central America
Birds of South America
Neotropic cormorant
Neotropic cormorant
Taxobox binomials not recognized by IUCN